Treviscoe is a village south of St Dennis in Cornwall, England, United Kingdom. There are large Imerys china clay works nearby.

References

Villages in Cornwall